Widewater State Park is a state park in Virginia, located in Stafford County. Land for the park was purchased in 2006 from Dominion Resources, but the Great Recession prevented development of the property. Ground was finally broken for the new park in 2018 after money was appropriated by the Virginia General Assembly with a bond issue in that year. Current facilities include a visitor center and staff building along Aquia Creek and a soft boat launch and picnic shelter along the Potomac River. A formal opening date in fall 2018 was set. The park officially opened in 2019.

The park is divided up into five parcels, separated by private property. It is located on a 1,100-acre peninsula situated between Aquia Creek and the Potomac River, and was the site of early flight experiments by Samuel P. Langley.

See also
 List of Virginia state parks
 List of Virginia state forests

References

Protected areas of Stafford County, Virginia
Protected areas established in 2019
2019 establishments in Virginia